Andrew Wilde (born 1965) is a British classical pianist.  

Wilde studied at Chetham's School of Music and the Royal Northern College of Music in Manchester, the city where he is still based. His music teachers included Ryszard Bakst.

Wilde plays often as a recitalist, and has a particular affinity for the music of Chopin.

However, he also has a wide concerto repertoire. Wilde has performed with the following English orchestras: Bournemouth Symphony Orchestra, Halle Orchestra, London Mozart Players, London Philharmonic Orchestra, Royal Liverpool Philharmonic, Royal Philharmonic Orchestra.
In the Americas he has performed with the National Symphony Orchestra (Washington) and Dallas Symphony Orchestra.

His discography includes Haydn sonatas.

In 2006 he marked the Mozart anniversary by a series of concerts of the violin sonatas with the Hungarian violinist Vilmos Szabadi.

References

1965 births
Living people
English classical pianists
Male classical pianists
International Ettore Pozzoli Piano Competition prize-winners
People educated at Chetham's School of Music
21st-century classical pianists
21st-century British male musicians